Chris Houston may refer to:
Chris Houston (American football) (born 1984), American football cornerback
Chris Houston (musician), Canadian musician
Chris Houston (rugby league) (born 1985), who as of 2017 plays for Widnes Vikings